Wallaceina raviniae is a species of monoxenous trypanosomatid. It is known to parasitise Brachycera flies, and was first found in Ecuador.

Comparison and phylogenetic analysis of 18S ribosomal RNA and glycosomal glyceraldehyde-3-phosphatedehydrogenase sequences of trypanosomatid taxa suggest Wallaceina raviniae be reassigned to the newly proposed genus Wallacemonas.

References

External links
 

Parasitic excavates
Trypanosomatida
Protists described in 2014